The 1651 wreckage of San José and the subsequent killings and looting carried out by indigenous Cuncos was a defining event in Colonial Chile that contributed to Spanish-Cunco tensions that led to the Battle of Río Bueno and the Mapuche uprising of 1655.

Background
The Spanish city of Valdivia had been reestablished by the Spanish in 1645 following a 1643 Dutch attempt to establish a settlement in the location. More than a city the Spanish settlement of Valdivia was by 1651 a military garrison tasked with constructing the Valdivian Fort System in case the Dutch or any other naval power would attempt to take Valdivia again. This garrison was financed by the Real Situado, an annual payment of silver to strengthen the military of war-torn Chile. As Valdivia was surrounded by hostile Mapuche territory the only access to the Spanish settlement was by sea. In January 1651 the Spanish and Mapuches had celebrated the Parliament of Boroa renewing the fragile peace that had been established in the parliaments of Quilín of 1641 and 1647.

Wreckage and aftermath
The Spanish ship San José was sailing to Valdivia was pushed by storms on March 26 onto coasts inhabited by the Cuncos, a southern Mapuche tribe. There, the ship ran aground and while most of the crew managed to survive the wreck, nearby Cuncos killed them and took possession of the valuable cargo. Among the cargo was the payment to the garrison of Valdivia. According to  Diccionario Geográfico de la República de Chile (1899) the site of the wreck was Punta Galera. 

A subsequent Spanish expedition departed from Chiloé to the wreck. Led by Captain Gaspar de Alvarado the divers of the expedition made unsatisfactory attempts to recover the part of the cargo they thought was still in the wreck. Governor Acuña Cabrera was temporarily dissuaded to send a punitive expedition from Boroa by Jesuits fathers Diego de Rosales and Juan de Moscoso who argued that the murders were committed by a few Indians and warned the governor that renewing warfare would evaporate gains obtained at Boroa. Being a peripheral southern group the Cuncos had not taken part in the Spanish-Mapuche parliaments, yet the prospect of new hostilities was deemed to be detrimental to the peace with the tribes further north. Punitive expeditions were finally sent against the Cunco, one from Valdivia and one from Carelmapu.

Governor of Valdivia Diego González Montero advanced south with his forces but soon found that tribes he expected to join him as allies were indifferent and even misled him with false rumors. His troops ran out of supplies and had to return to Valdivia. While González Montero was away coastal Huilliches killed twelve Spanish and sending their heads to other Mapuche groups of southern Chile "as if they wanted to create a grand uprising" according to historian Diego Barros Arana. Both Spanish expeditions were meant to meet each other at Bueno River but the failure of the expedition from Valdivia prevented this. The expedition from Carelmapu led by Captain Ignacio Carrera Yturgoyen penetrated north to the vicinity of the ruins of Osorno where they were approached by Huilliches who handed over three "caciques", allegedly responsible for the murders. The Spanish and local Huilliches exchanged words telling each other of the benefits of peace. Then, the Spanish of Carelmapu executed the three, hanged them in hooks as a warning, and returned south.  Spanish soldiers in Concepción, the "military capital" of Chile, were dissatisfied with the results. Barros Arana consider some may have pushed for renewed war for personal benefit.

References

Bibliography 

San Jose
San Jose
San Jose
Conflicts in 1651
History of Los Ríos Region
History of Los Lagos Region
1651 in the Captaincy General of Chile
January events
Huilliche history
Coasts of Los Ríos Region